Saara may refer to:

Places
 Saara, Estonia, a village in Lääne-Viru County, Estonia
 Saara, Greiz, a municipality in Thuringia, Germany
 Saara, Altenburger Land, a municipality in Thuringia, Germany

Other
 Saara (lizard), a genus of lizard in the Uromastycinae subfamily
 Saara (name), a female given name
 Sara Forsberg, Finnish singer better known as SAARA
  (Saara), Rio de Janeiro, Brazil, a shopping district